The Northern and Southern Cups are the two major regional quidditch tournaments of the United Kingdom. Organised by QuadballUK, the tournaments serve both as qualification prerequisites for other tournaments, such as the European Quidditch Cup and the British Quidditch Cup alongside being their own stand alone tournaments. Regionals are often considered the most important tournaments of the year after the British Quidditch Cup and they serve as qualifiers for the latter tournament. Those teams that fail to qualify for BQC each season compete in the Development Cup instead. From 2021 onwards the tournaments have been held as a series of one-day fixtures exclusively for university teams with the equivalent Community League tournament held for community teams.

History

The idea for a regional tournament originally came from Southampton Quidditch Club, who devised an independently organised Southern Cup, which was due to take place in February 2014. Inspired by this, Keele Quidditch Club created a counterpart "Northern Squirrel Cup" open to all the teams who were not invited to the Southern Cup (on the basis of geographical location). Due to adverse weather conditions, the Southern Cup's expected debut was cancelled, but the Northern Cup went ahead as planned in March. Eight teams competed, with Bangor Broken Broomsticks winning the tournament after beating Nottingham in the final. The Southern Cup eventually went ahead in November of that year—the next quidditch season—where another eight teams competed. Southampton, the hosts, were defeated in the final by Radcliffe Chimeras.

Seeing the initial success of these tournaments, QuadballUK, the United Kingdom's governing body for quidditch, took both tournaments under their control, in time for the 2015–16 season. These tournaments were organised by QuadballUK and a committee selected by them, rather than by any specific club. Similarly, no club officially hosted either tournament, though both locations were situated nearby to established QuadballUK teams. The Northern Cup was hosted at Belmont Community School in Durham on 31 October–1 November, while the Southern Cup took place at Horspath Athletics Ground in Oxford, on 14–15 November. The latter had played host to several tournaments in the past, including the 2015 European Quidditch Cup.

From 2016 onwards as there were now more teams in the United Kingdom than the British Quidditch Cup could support both the Northern and Southern Cups were used as qualifiers for it. From 2016 to 2019, the top 16 teams from each tournament moved on to BQC, with any teams who did not qualify eligible to compete instead at the Development Cup.

In 2021 following the Quidditch UK university-community split the format of both cups was changed. Instead of being single two-day knockout tournaments Northern and Southern now take place as series of two single day round-robin fixtures with only university teams competing. The new equivalent Community League following the same format but with three single day fixtures per season was set-up for community teams. The top 12 teams across both Northern and Southern qualify for the university tournament at the British Quidditch Cup, with the top 12 community teams across the Community League qualifying for the community BQC tournament. Development Cup is still held for any teams who do not qualify for BQC.

Qualification

Qualification for either tournament is based solely on the geographical location of the team, with no regard to experience or skill level. A theoretical horizontal line is drawn at latitude 52.632000 (52°37′55.2″), dictating that any teams based south of that line compete at the Southern Cup, and all north at the Northern Cup. Up until 2021 there was no additional criteria and any team registered with QuadballUK was eligible to play. From the 2021/2022 season onwards, only teams affiliated with a university could compete at the Northern and Southern Cups and a separate UK-wide Community League was created for community teams.

Format

Traditionally, the tournaments have consisted of pool play, followed by bracket play, in a standard knockout tournament structure. The exact format however is flexible, due to the varying number of teams competing in each iteration of the cups. The top two teams from each group move through to the upper bracket while the rest play in the consolation bracket. In order to balance group play and allow for more representative bracket play a seeding system is used.

Seeding 
All teams are split into three categories: first seeds, second seeds and unseeded teams. How teams are seeded depends on where they came at last years nationals and how many groups there are in the competition. Each group is randomly allocated a first and second seeded team, then the unseeded teams are randomly allocated a group.

The teams final standing in tournaments affects their seeding for the upcoming British Quidditch Cup. The top four teams are placed in the first seed, the fifth to eighth teams are second seeded, and any other qualifying teams are unseeded.

University/community team split and new format 
For the 2021/2022 season and onwards, the format of the Northern and Southern Cups was changed. University and community teams would no longer compete together with there now being a separate Community League for teams not affiliated with a university. This meant that only university teams would now compete at Northern and Southern. In addition, the format of both tournaments was changed. Teams now compete in either two or three (depending on the number of teams attending) divisions within their region, with each division having 4-6 teams in it. Each cup is now split across two different 1 day events instead of being a singular 2 day tournament. Teams play a round-robin event within their division during each fixture and are ranked accordingly. Teams who place last in their division are relegated to the division below and teams who place first in their division are promoted to the division above for the next fixture. The final rankings after all fixtures are used to determine seedings and qualification for the British Quidditch Cup and European Qualifier Tournament.

Past champions

Northern champions

Updated format

Southern champions

Updated Format

Northern Cup

2014 
The first Northern Cup was held at Keele University in March 2014. Eight teams competed over the weekend with Bangor Broken Broomsticks being the eventual winners. The final standings were as follows:

Final standings

2015 
The second Northern Cup was held on 31 October 2015 in Belmont. Fourteen teams competed after the withdrawal of the Preston Poltergeists. After two days of competitive games, composed of pool play and both upper and Consolation brackets, the final standings were as follows:

Upper bracket

Consolation bracket

Final standings

2016 
The third Northern Cup returned to Belmont on 12 November 2016. Twenty teams competed over the weekend. On the first day, five groups of four played each other, with the two highest ranked teams from each group moving into the upper bracket while the rest competed in the Consolation bracket. This was the first tournament to be used to qualify teams for nationals, with the top 16 teams invited to compete in the coming British Quidditch Cup. The results of the tournament were as follows:

Upper bracket

Consolation bracket 

After bracket play had finished, two more matches were played between the four quarter-finals losers in order to rank the 15th–18th places:

Final standings

2017 

The fourth Northern Cup was held at Sheffield Hallam Sports Park on 25–26 November 2017. Twenty-five teams competed over the weekend. Velociraptors Quidditch Club were the champions for the second time in a row.

Final standings

2018 
The fifth Northern Cup was held at Sheffield Hallam Sports Park on 10–11 November 2018. Twenty-two teams competed over the weekend. On the first day, 2 groups of five and three groups of four played each other, with the top 12 ranked teams overall moving into the upper bracket, with 8 further teams playing play-in matches, with the losers joining the final two teams in the Consolation bracket. The top 16 teams were invited to compete in the upcoming British Quidditch Cup; the unsuccessful teams would have another opportunity to qualify via the Development Cup. The top 5 teams were invited to EQT, the nationwide qualifying tournament for the upcoming European Quidditch Cup. The results of the tournament were as follows:

Group stage

Notes

Upper bracket

EQT/Fifth-place play-off

Consolation bracket

Notes

Final standings

2019 
The sixth Northern Cup was held at Sheffield Hallam Sports Park on 23–24 November 2019, making it the third Northern in a row to be held at that venue. Twenty teams competed over the weekend. On the first day, 5 groups of four teams each played each other. At the end of this group stage, the teams were all ranked 1-20 based on their performance. The top 4 ranked teams then played against each other (the team ranked 1st played against the team ranked 4th, 2nd played against 3rd), with this process then continuing for teams 5-8 and so on. This 'ranking bracket' stage, which took place over the end of day 1 and start of day 2 and allowed for teams to move up or down the rankings for the final 'play-in bracket' stage on the second day. This final stage consisted of each team playing two more games, effectively a 'semi-final' and then either a 'final' or 'consolation' match within each group of 4 rankings (1-4, 5–8, etc.). The top 15 teams qualified for the British Quidditch Cup in April 2020, however this tournament was later cancelled due to COVID-19. The 2nd-to-7th ranked teams were invited to EQT, the nationwide qualifying tournament for the upcoming European Quidditch Cup. Due to weather conditions the grass pitches at the venue were unable to be used resulting in all matches being played on 3G which affected the planned play-in stage. The results of the tournament were as follows:

Group stage

Group A

Group B

Group C

Group D

Group E

Ranking Stage 
In each ranking bracket the participants of the second match would be the loser of a higher-ranked first match playing the winner of the next lower-ranked first match. For example, Chester Centurions lost against Velociraptors in their first match so they then played against Holyrood Hippogriffs Firsts who won the next match down in the rankings. The exceptions to this are the winners of the highest-ranked first match (Velociraptors and Olympians Quidditch Club) and the losers of the lowest-ranked first match (Manchester Minotaurs and Sheffield Steelfins) in each ranking bracket who all did not play a second match.

Ranking Bracket 1

Ranking Bracket 2

Notes

Play-in Stage 
As a result of the grass pitches not being used because of the weather, the play-in stage was significantly cut down. It was originally scheduled that all teams would compete in this stage to determine the final standings, however only half the planned number of matches were played and as a result some teams did not play any matches in this stage.

Final

7th place playoff

15th place playoff

Notes

Final standings

2021/2022 
Due to COVID-19, the planned Northern Cup that would have taken place in November 2020 for the 2020/2021 season was cancelled. For the 2021/2022 season, the new format came in with only university teams competing and the tournament split into two different 1 day round-robin fixtures.

Northern 1 
The first fixture took place at the Salford Sports Village in Manchester on the 8th November 2021. The tournament results were as follows:

Division 1 

Sheffield Squids moved down to Division 2 for the second fixture.

Division 2 

Manchester Manticores moved up to Division 1 for the second fixture.

Northern 2 
The second fixture was scheduled to take place in Edinburgh on the 26th February 2022, however it was cancelled due to the venue deeming the pitches unplayable. Spots for the upcoming EQC and BQC tournaments would be based on the results of the Northern 1 fixture.

2022/2023 
The first Northern fixture of the 2022/2023 season is scheduled for 12 November 2022 taking place in the North with the second fixture scheduled for 18 February 2023 taking place in either Scotland or the North East.

Southern Cup

2014 
The first Southern Cup was hosted by Southampton Quidditch Club on the 8–9 November. 8 teams competed over the weekend. The first day consisted of two groups of 4 teams each while the second day was a knockout. By the end of the weekend Oxfords Radcliffe Chimeras claimed gold, Southampton silver and London Unspeakables 3rd. The full brackets and final standings where as follows:

Bracket Play

Final standings

2015 
The second Southern Cup was held on the 14th and 15 November at Horspath Athletics Track (oxford), was due to follow a similar structure to its northern counterpart. However, due to technical issues the Consolation bracket had to be cancelled. Seventeen teams competed over the weekend with Oxfords Radcliffe Chimeras eventually claiming Gold. the upper bracket results are as follows:

Bracket play

Final standings

2016 
The third Southern Cup took place on the 29–30 October at Millbrook Rugby Club in Southampton. 17 teams competed over the weekend with the top 16 qualifying for the coming British Quidditch cup. The weekend followed a similar structure to last years with day one being group stage and day to single elimination knockout. Due to only 16 teams qualifying for BQC a play in match between the two lowest seed teams after day one was played to distinguish 16th and 17th place. by the end of the tournament Warwick QC had claimed gold, the full bracket results and final standings where as follows:

Upper bracket

Consolation bracket

Final standings

2017 
The fourth Southern Cup took place on the 11–12 November at Millbrook Rugby Club in Southampton. 21 teams competed over the weekend with the Top 15 qualifying for the coming British Quidditch cup. The weekend followed a similar structure to the format of previous years, with day one having group stage matches and day two containing single elimination playoffs. Due to only 15 teams qualifying for BQC, play in matches took place between the lowest seeded teams in the Lower Bracket to determine the teams that qualify. The tournament was won by Southampton QC Firsts. The full bracket results are as follows:

Upper bracket

Consolation bracket

2018 
The fifth Southern Cup took place on 24–25 November at Knole Academy in Sevenoaks, Kent. 18 teams competed over the weekend, with the top 14 qualifying for the upcoming British Quidditch Cup. Furthermore, the top 7 teams would qualify for EQT, the nationwide qualifying tournament for the European Quidditch Cup. On the first day, two groups of five and two groups of four played each other. Unlike Northern Cup, there was no consolation bracket. Instead, all 18 teams would compete in the upper bracket, with the bottom 4 teams participating in play-in games. The tournament was won by the Werewolves of London.

Upper bracket

Notes

EQT play-offs

BQC play-offs 

Of the 8 Round of 16 losers, the bottom 4 were chosen to face off for the final two BQC spots.

2019 
The sixth Southern Cup took place on 9–10 November at the Harcout Hill Campus at Oxford Brookes University. Sixteen teams competed over the weekend. On the first day, 4 groups of four teams each played each other. At the end of this group stage, each team would play a team from a different group that was ranked at the same level. For example, the top ranked team of group A (London Unspeakables) played against the top ranked team of group B (Werewolves of London Firsts). Teams that won this play-off played a team from the rank above them who lost their first match and vice versa. The exception were the losers of lowest-ranked play-off (Bournemouth Banshees and Bristol Bears) and the winners of the highest-ranked play-off (Werewolves of London Firsts and London Quidditch Club A) who did not play a second match in this stage. This 'ranking' stage took place over the end of day 1 and start of day 2. The final 'play-in' stage consisted of four team brackets, with the teams playing a 'semi-final' then either a 'final' or 'consolation' match within their bracket. Thus the top bracket of 4 teams was playing for 1st - 4th, the second bracket was playing for 5th–8th and so on. The teams that finished the tournament in the upper brackets qualified to compete at the British Quidditch Cup in April 2020, however this tournament was later cancelled due to COVID-19. In addition, the team that won the tournament, Werewolves of London Firsts, was immediately eligible to attend European Quidditch Cup Division 1. Any teams that finished in the lower brackets were eligible to play at the Development Cup which was held in Salford Sports Village on 7–8 March 2020. The results of the tournament were as follows:

Group stage

Group A

Group B

Group C

Group D

Ranking Stage

Ranking Bracket 1

Ranking Bracket 2

Play-in Stage

Bracket 1 (1st - 4th)

Bracket 2 (5th–8th)

Bracket 3 (9th–12th)

Bracket 4 (13th–16th)

Final standings

2021/2022 
Due to COVID-19, the planned Southern Cup that would have taken place in November 2020 for the 2020/2021 season was cancelled. For the 2021/2022 season, the new format came in with only university teams competing and the tournament split into two different 1 day round-robin fixtures.

Southern 1 
The first fixture took place on 20 November 2021 at the King's House Sports Ground in London. As only five teams were competing, only one division was used. The fixture results were as follows:

Southern 2 
The second fixture was originally scheduled to take place on 20 February 2022 at the Cardiff City House of Sport in Cardiff, however it was postponed due to storm damage to the venue and instead took place on 12 March at the same location. The fixture results were as follows:

2022/2023 
The first Southern fixture of the 2022/2023 season is scheduled for 5 November 2022 taking place in the South West with the second fixture scheduled for 11 February 2023 taking place in the South.

Community League
The Community League was started in 2021 after the Northern and Southern Cups were made into tournaments only for university quidditch teams. It acts as an 

equivalent tournament for community teams. The format is the same as the updated Northern and Southern format, with teams divided into divisions of around 5 teams each that compete at multiple one day round-robin fixtures in a season. The relegation and promotion system is also the same with teams that place last in a fixture being relegated to a lower division and teams that place first being promoted to a higher one. The Community League has three fixtures per season (compared with the two fixtures per season for Northern and Southern) and final rankings after all fixtures are used to determine seedings and qualification for the British Quidditch Cup and European Qualifier Tournament.

2021/2022 Season

Fixture 1 
The debut fixture of the Community League was planned to take place on 14 August 2021, however in June the decision was made to cancel this fixture to allow teams more time to prepare for full-contact games after social distancing regulations due to COVID-19 were relaxed. On 4 September, the first fixture was attended by 9 teams and took place at the Derby Rugby Football Club in Derby. Due to a number of teams being unable to attend, this fixture was decided beforehand to have no effect on the rest of the competitive season. For example, there would be no promotions or relegations between divisions based on the tournament and the results would not be used for seedings for the British Quidditch Cup or European Qualifier Tournament. In addition, the originally planned three divisions was reduced to two based on the attendance numbers. The full results were as follows:

Division 1

Division 2

Fixture 2 
A second fixture took place on 9 October 2021 at King's House Sports Ground in London and was attended by 12 teams. The originally planned three divisions were used at this tournament with 4 teams in each, teams competed in a round-robin before doing play-offs for 1st / 2nd place and 3rd / 4th place within each division to determine the final rankings.

The full results were as follows:

Division 1

Division 2

Division 3

2022/2023 Season

Fixture 1 
The first Community League fixture of the season took place on 2 July 2022 at the All Hallows RC High School in Manchester with 10 teams competing in a round-robin over 3 divisions. The fixture was originally scheduled to take place at the Salford Sports Village however due to a COVID outbreak at the venue the location was changed the day before the event.

The full results were as follows (teams in italics did not attend the fixture):

Division 1

Division 2

Division 3

Fixture 2 
The second fixture took place on 13 August 2022 at the Derby Rugby Football Club in Derby with 13 teams competing over 3 divisions. Due to extreme heat the event utilised the new IQA recommendations for water breaks. The event also coincided with a national rail strike on the same day.

The full results were as follows:

Division 1

Division 2

Division 3

Fixture 3 
The third and final Community League fixture of the season took place on 17 September 2022 at the Farnham Common Sports Club in Slough with 14 teams competing over 3 divisions.

Division 1

Division 2

Division 3

See also

 International Quidditch Association
 Quidditch (real-life sport)

References

External links
IQA website

Quidditch competitions
Recurring sporting events established in 2012
Sports competitions in the United Kingdom